Keith Nah (born 20 June 1995) is a Liberian footballer. He is a right-footed attacker, and is the first Liberian footballer to become top scorer in consecutive seasons in two different leagues in the same country. Considered one of the best players in the Myanmar National League, he is known for his dribbling, finishing, skill, pace, and ability to play with both feet. He is third all-time top scorer of MNL.

Career
Keith Nah started his football career with club Vinton Professional playing in the Liberian third division. After playing several seasons with Vinton in the third league, he helped his side gain promotion to the Liberia Football second division league. Vinton finished as runners-up to league winners Green Pasture FC, and Nah won himself the second division Most Valuable Player (MVP) title.

After the end of the 2010–11 league season, Keith Nah signed with the Liberian "oil boys" LPRC OILERS for 2012. That year, he was invited to the Liberia football U20 national team for the African youth qualifier against the Niger U20 national team.

In 2012 Keith Nah was invited to join the Myanmar second division club Chin United. He had a successful trial with Chin and was given the opportunity to play in the 2013 Myanmar second division league. Chin finished that season in second place and was promoted to the top tier of Myanmar football (the Myanmar National League). He also finished the season as the highest goal scorer with eighteen league goals. In the 2014 Myanmar National League, Keith Nah scored twenty-five league goals and four FA Cup goals. He finished the season second on the goal-scoring chart, one goal less than top goal scorer Cezar Augusto who finished with twenty-six goals. Keith Nah received offers from clubs from Malaysia, Indonesia, Thailand and South Korea. He signed with Malaysia Premier League club Kedah FA.

Following his arrival in Malaysia, Keith Nah scored seven goals out of Kedah's nine pre-season matches, making him the top goal scorer in the team for the pre-season. On his league debut, February 6, 2015, Nah scored twice to help his side win their 2015 league opener with a 5–1 victory over Kuala Lumpur. He scored once more in his club's second league game against Kuantan, that ended with a 2–2 draw.

After returning to Myanmar, Keith Nah helped his club Yadanarbon to win the 2016 MNL and becoming a joint top goalscorer with Nigerian Myanmar Win Naing Soe and Nigeria Christopher Chizoba who all scored 16 goals in the season.

International career
Nah was featured in the Liberia under-20 national team in 2013 African U-20 Championship qualification. The young national side was drawn against Niger with the first encounter away to Niger from 20 April 2012. The corresponding fixture was on 6 May 2012 in Monrovia.

Career statistics

Individual 
 Myanmar National League Top Scorer: 2016, 2017

References

External links
 

1995 births
Living people
Liberian footballers
Liberia under-20 international footballers
Association football forwards
LPRC Oilers players
Kedah Darul Aman F.C. players
Yadanarbon F.C. players
Ayeyawady United F.C. players
Shan United F.C. players
Liberian expatriate footballers
Liberian expatriate sportspeople in Myanmar
Liberian expatriate sportspeople in Malaysia
Expatriate footballers in Malaysia
Expatriate footballers in Myanmar
Sportspeople from Monrovia